Alin Zaha (born 29 September 1977) is a Romanian professional footballer who plays for SG Ausbach/Friedewald as a defender.

References

External links
 
 Alin Zaha at fupa.net

1977 births
Living people
Sportspeople from Arad, Romania
Romanian footballers
Association football defenders
Liga I players
Liga II players
FC UTA Arad players
FC Bihor Oradea players
CF Liberty Oradea players
CS Național Sebiș players
Romanian expatriate footballers
Romanian expatriate sportspeople in Germany
Expatriate footballers in Germany